Bagal (pronounced as Bāgāl) is a cattle herding caste of East India. Bagal people are living in the state of West Bengal, Jharkhand and Odisha. They use Kudmali / Manbhumi dialect of Bengali as mother tongue (with local variation, labelled as Bagal Bhasa) and use Bengali, Hindi and Odia language to communicate with the society.

Overview
Bagal is assumed as an ethnically tribe derived caste (semi-tribal/ semi-Hinduized Aboriginals). Their socio-cultural behaviour is blend of Hinduism and Animism, and they are one of the marginalized section of Indian society. Their primary concentration in the valley region of the Subarnarekha, i.e., in Balasore, Mayurbhanj, Paschim Medinipur, Jhargram, East Singhbhum, Saraikela Kharsawan and Purulia districts of East India. Historically, as a cattle herder community they were also got linked with the All India Yadav Mahasabha (most likely the northern section of Bagal) during sanskritisation movement in India and went through various socio-cultural purification process. Nowadays they almost Hinduized and stratified according to their territorial division, but due to out-caste marriage and cattle slaughter in starvation, they all are relatively considered as inferior in Hindu social hierarchy.

Etymology
The word Bagal is pronounced as Bāgāl (বাগাল, Bengali synonym: Rākhāl). The term "Bagal" literally means "herder", which refers to a person whose job it is to tend to and graze domestic animals, particularly cattle.  Either their own or in contractual basis of landowners domestic animal. In case of herding cattle of landowners, they were given responsibilities of various household chores. The word Bagal is Bengali derived Kudmali word. In Odia it is pronounced as Bagāḻa, which is Singhbhum origin, bearing same meaning.

Population 
The Registrar General and Census Commissioner of India do not consider caste as a factor for the Census of India except Scheduled Castes and Scheduled Tribes, so there is no detailed information available now for the current population. The last census enumerated caste as a factor before the Independence of India i.e., The last census happened in 1931. The Mayurbhanj state census 1931 recorded a total of 1621 people living in Mayurbhanj state i.e., 1321 form Baripada (mostly from place called Khanua. Southwestern nearby of Haripurgarh, third headquarter of the state), 234 from Kaptipada, 52 from Bamanghati and 14 from Panchpir Subdivision and the census also referred to census 1901. Where Bagal returns are 7824 from Medinipur, 1404 from Singhbhum, 854 from Orissa tributary states, 602 from Manbhum, 383 from Chota Nagpur tributary states, 10 from Balasore and 5 from Puri, who are returned as Hindu. All those Bagals are included in Ahir (broadly tabulated in Ahir and Goala, as indistinguishable features of those two terms and Ahir also includes 4299 Mahkur i.e. 4159 from Chota Nagpur tributary state and 140 from Ranchi, 91 Khandwal from Singhbhum) except Bankura where 1520 Bagals are included in Bauri. In 1911, 730 Bagal returned from Bankura, included in Bauri and 4581 Bagal along with 2154 Ahir from Medinipur, included in Goala. In the census 1891, a total of 8364 Bagals returned from Chota Nagpur Division i.e., 6179 from Singbhum, 2180 from Manbhum and 6 from Lohardaga–Palamu. In 1871, 2077 Bagals returned from Manbhum and included as subdivision of Goala. However, In recent past  estimated 20,000 Bagals living in undivided Paschim Medinipur district during his field work.

Specifically their major concentration is in, but not confined to Ichagarh, Chandil, Saraikela, Adityapur (Gamarhia) and Gobindapur (Rajnagar) of Saraikela Kharsawan district, Golmuri-cum-Jugsalai and Potka of East Singhbhum district in Jharkhand; Ranibandh, Raipur, Sarenga, Simlapal of Bankura district, Narayangarh, Sankrail, Gopiballavpur, Jhargram, Binpur of Jhargram district, Kharagpur, Debra, Pingla, Sabang,  Keshiary, Nayagram, Dantan  of Paschim Medinipur district in West Bengal; Kaptipada, Udala, Samakhunta, Khunta, Badsahi, Baripada, Kuliana, Suliapada, Muruda, Betnati of Mayurbhanj district, Balasore, Remuna, Nilagiri of Balasore district. And village in Ranital GP, Baulakani GP are migrant village of Odisha in Bhadrak and Kendrapara district respectively.

Social structure
In the Hindu social structure, Bagal people fall in lower section of the Varna system but they perceive themselves in the middle range of caste hierarchy following tribal characteristics and relatively considered as a clean caste by the tribal community and unclean caste by upper Hindu caste.

 Though the Bagals call themselves Gopas, the  "higher" Hindu castes do not regard them as proper sat-sudras, but do not explicitly state that they are asat-sudras or antyajas. From their features it seems that Bagals have descended from tribal pastoralists and become Hinduized. Radhiya Brahmans do not serve them ritually but Madhya-desiya and Utkal Brahmans do. The Bagals of rural areas are either subsistence farmers or landless agricultural labourers. None of them are seen these days to depend on cattle rearing, their traditional calling. 

There are four stratified endogamous subdivision of Bagal society namely Ahir Bagal, Khanroal/ Khandait Bagal, Krishna Bagal and Mogodha Bagal. The northern section of Bagal regard themselves as Gopas, So the name of endogamous group change to Ahir Gop, Akhara Gop, Krishna Gop, Nanda Gop.  but have totemic clan (gotra) like Nag, Doshi, Angaria, Kachima, Chawniya, etc. In the Krishna Bagal, there are approximately 23–25 mejor lineage (bansa) i.e., Arikuḷa/ Araikuḷa, Banardiha, Bankuar, Buru Bhatua/ Buruhatua, Bukuria, Chardiha, Danadiha, Deoḷia, Gutisukri/ Butisukri, Hajombanda/ Hajam Banta, Jetuar/ Jegoar, Kuḷmahata, Kurkutia, Lakuḷ, Manikdiha, Patkam, Punihasa/ Punrihesa, Samdia/ Samdiha, Sonahatu, Satbhaya, Sikaria, Tetla with phonetic variation. Which are named after their ancestral territory, any special events or activities of the lineage. Again those bigger lineages are subdivided into some sub-lineage as lineage Bankura subdivided into Harma Bankuar, Jajo Bankuar, Baku Bankuar and Harin Bankuar, Patkam subdivided into Baghamaria Patkam and Rahe Patkam, Banardiha subdivided into Gora Banardiha and Kalia Banardiha, Lakuḷ subdivided into Gora Lakuḷ and Kalia Lakuḷ, etc. bearing both totemic clan (gotra) like Nag (Snake), Sal, Kachim (Tortoise), Siyal, Boni (Indian Myna), Singai and non totemic clan like  Kashyapa, Sandilya.  Buru Bhatua/ Buruhatua and Deoḷia lineage claim that they were the community level priest (Dehri) of the Bagal society. There is no information about the Magadha Bagal. They are probably the Bagals of Purulia, who now identify themselves as Gopas (distinct from Gopa caste). Each sub-divisional group marries within their endogamous group/sub-caste and the major difference among the three endogamous groups is that the Ahir and the Khanadit Bagal use the clan (gotra) name as the lineage (bansa) name, whereas clan and lineage are two different thing for Krishna Bagal. Thus Ahir and Khandait Bagal use clan as an exogamous unit while Krishna Bagal uses lineage as an exogamous unit.

History

Mythology
The mythological story may vary depending upon their endogamous division and region. But they all associate themselves with Lord Krishna as their traditional occupation with cattle herding. For instance the myth of Bagals of Midnapore region is like that, Lord Krishna used to go to the pasture every day to graze the cattle. Sometimes he felt tired and wanted to be free from the monotonous work of daily cattle herding. So Load Krishna made a 'Bagal' from sweat and dirt of his own body so that he could graze the cattle in the pastures every day.  One day that Bagal shows some Munda people dancing in the Jungle, in the process of his routine job of cattle herding.  Then the Bagal joined with them and fell in love with a Munda girl.  After that the Bagal and Munda girl got married. Thus they believe that they are the progenitor of that couple. Being descendants of Lord Krishna, they also claim themselves as Krishna Gop/ Krishna Bagal.

Origin and occupation
The origin of the Bagal caste remains uncertain. As K. S. Singh believed that the Bagal people migrated from central India and they are one of the original settlers of erstwhile Singhbhum district of Bihar (now Jharkhand). From where they got their occupational name Bagal. Due to social instability in the region, they migrated to Mayurbhanj, Medinipur, Dhalbhum and Manbhum of Bengal province for better livelihood. Whereas the Mayurbhanj State census 1931 noted as;The Bagals are the cattle–herds. Herding cattle is their principal occupation. In the census of 1901, the Bagals of Medinapore ware included in the Ahir and Gohala, and those of Bankura in Bauri. ...But a note has been left to the effect that they form a real caste in Mayurbhanj and Saraikela State, which is a fact. Through the large number of Bagals still follow their traditional occupation, many of them have taken to agriculture. 
And Marvin Davis noted as;The Bagals are traditionally associated with work as cattle herders. In 1971, though, the Bagals of Torkotala village [in Midanapore] worked as agricultural laborers, cultivating smaller plots  their own on the side. Based on their traditional association with cattle, the Bagals have recently  advanced a claim to be Goalas by caste. It is unlikely that this claim will be recognized by other Hindus (of the village), though, at least not in the immediate future, for Sadgops are aware that their own caste is regarded as a purified section of Goala. For the Bagals to establish their claim as Goalas would be indirectly to link the Sadgop and Bagal castes to each other, a link which the Sadgops adamantly deny.

Although some of the Bagal people claim that they're descendants of Yadav group of caste like Ahir, Goala, Gop, Gopal but most of them can't able to answer how the caste was formed. However the Bagals of undivided Midnapore narrate that their ancestor immigrated from erstwhile Bihar and a few are from Mayurbhanj, And as per 1931 census 3 percent of Bagals of Mayurbhanj are immigrants of Midnapore and Singhbhum. By looking at their genealogy and ethnolinguistic affiliation, it's assumed by scholar and ethnographer that the people of Bagal caste had aboriginal descendants, who settled in East Chota Nagpur by adopting cattle herding occupation.

Overally, Bagal people are might be descendants of Gond/Gour ethnic group or/and cattle–herder of any tribe and caste, because of various socio-historical processes they segmented and formed real caste by adopting regional language and culture.  Further the community is fragmented into territory based sub-divisional endogamous group on the basis of regional status and subsidiary activities they were involved. Subsequently, entered into the Hindu caste system with the trend of Hinduization, resulting social stratification. Nowadays Bagal settlement mostly found on both sides of the Subarnarekha river which is the borderline of Jharkhand, Odisha and West Bengal. And only the Bagals of Subarnarekha valley and recent migrants living in nearby districts are known as Bagals, well bounded in between Damodar and Baitarani river. Because some of them claim that their kinsmen migrated to North Bengal and Northeast India to work as tea garden laborers during the British Raj. But other sources shows that the Bagals were in Assam as a tea garden labourers.

Although the people of Bagal caste were traditionally part of pastoralist society, nowadays none of them are seen doing their traditional calling occupation, herding cattle and it's associate activities. Instead agriculture is their primary occupation now. During 19th and early 20th century the Bagals were employed as Baromasia (domestic serf), Bhatua (worker in exchange of food), Dhangar (animal caretaker), Kamins/Muliya (labour) and Munis (helper) along with their traditional occupation Bagal (cattle herder) in affluent household. In the growth of Indian social development some of them switched to different occupations from their racial occupation but still majority of population depends on agriculture and other unskilled work. The Bagals mostly live in rural areas, nearby to reserve forest. Both in forest and revenue villages. The people of the revenue village make their livelihood by agriculture, manual labor, fishing, unorganised work and a few among them are government servants like school teacher, forest guard, defence personnel. And the people of forest village make their livelihood by agriculture, hunting, animal husbandry, collecting forest products.

Uprising 
The livelihood of the Bagals was mostly dependent on forest and agriculture from ancient times. As a pastoral community, they were depend on the forest for pasture. Their livelihood worsened when the Britishers imposed exploitative zamindari rules and high taxes on forest rights in the Jangal Mahal of Bengal Presidency. They began to oppose the rules as there is evidence that they were listed in various criminal records of the British India. Thereafter, they became a part of the Santhal rebellion and other regional peasant movement to fight against the Britishers.

The Bagals of Medinapore were involved in large-scale plundering of food grain from wealthy household, a form of food riots caused by a man-made famine in 1943 that fuelled up the Bagals to participate in the Independence India movement.

Culture
Bagal people believe in Folk Hinduism but have no definite Hinduistic jati purana (etiological myths) among them. Their socio-cultural behaviour mostly revolve around agriculture and warships of community deity. They traditionally used to sacrifices animals, draw khoda (tattoo) and dag (cauterization, both for medical and marking purposes) their bodies, participate on traditional group dances and many other primitive activities. Dressing sense also changed over the time. Like they traditionally used to wear white dhuti and saree with red or black stripe on both the end, before shifting to current designed full pant-shirt and saree-blowse for male and female respectively.  But nowadays they almost left their own socio-cultural practices and greatly adopted the Hindu way of life, such as the Birth-death-marriage rituals are performed with the help of priest-baberman-washerman castes and son-in-law for the purpose of  purity of Hindu society. While at the same time in the communal rituals, the Dehri or Deheri (a person who adorer to local tantraic deity), designated head of the society or head of household perform the rituals. In current scenario the Bagal tradition and rituals are replaced by Hindu belief and only the older generation living in Bagal majority villages retain their own tradition and rituals.

Life cycle
Humans go through various stages of age, and those steps are observed in a variety of social disciplines. Although the social customs of the Bagal society based on Hinduism, but the methods and purposes are inclined toward Animism.

When a baby is born in the Bagal race, they immediately announce the good news to their relatives and celebrate a festival on the ninth day of the baby's birth, called Narta Ghar, and the baby is named in the twenty-first day. In adolescence, the boy grazes domestic animals, assists his parents with household chores. During puberty, the boy tries to learn agricultural and other sustainable work. The first menstruation of the girl is not seriously observed. Only the affluent family organise a fest. When a boy or girl reaches their marriage age, the family seeks out a suitable spouse for them in their endogamous subdivision. They don't practice cross cousin  or same lineage marriage. There are four types of marriage for the people of Bagal community, namely Dekha Chahan Behaghar (arrange marriage), Palaniya/ Sindur ghasa Behaghar (love marriage), Kuta Mala Behaghar (a low cost/ urgent marriage) and Sanga Behaghar (widow remarriage). The method of marriage are by negotiation, courtship, intrusion, mutual consent, exchange or by force. They also practice sororate and levirate marriages, and marriage are always preferred monogamy type but polygamy also seen among them. During pregnancy, a woman has to follow a variety of traditions, rituals as well as taboos. At seven months of pregnancy, the woman's family member happily brings a variety of food and organizes a small feast with the neighbours which they call the Shad Khia.

They mostly cremate dead bodies with Hindu rituals except if the dead body is a pregnant women or kid, then they bury the dead body.

Festivals
There are two types of festivals based on how they give importance to those festivals.

Bangsa puja / Gotar puja/ Ghar puja, Gan puja, Asali puja,  Mag puja, Jantal puja, Nua khai are community level festivals, which are celebrated within their lineage, sublineage, clan or family. Meanwhile, Makar parab, Durga puja, Bandna, Kali puja, Tusu puja, Raja parab, Gamha parab festivals are celebrated with the neighbouring communities of their locality. The Bagals also belief in variety of benevolent and malevolent deities and spirits. Among the significant benevolent deities worshipped by the Bagal are Shiva, Kali, Durga, Garam-Dharam or Sarna, Burha Budhi, Bagut/Bhahuti, Rohini, Goroya Karam, Pahar, Sannyash, Manasa, Jitiya and Bonkumari, among others.

Bandna Parab, a cattle worshiping festival and Karam Puja, a ritual of worship Karam tree (representing the Karam God) are important festival cum culture for the youth of Bagals.

Dance and music
Bagal people dance to a variety of songs during the festival to make life more enjoyable. Karam Nach, Pata Nach, Kathi Nach, Chhou Nach and Jhumar Nach are key activities. And sing various associated songs of those dance like Jhumar geet, Bandna geet, Makar geet, Karam geet, Ahira daker geet, Tusu geet. Nachni and Rasikia are two terms used for people, who are good at Dancing and Singing. Often those songs and folklore depicted their past and experiences of their lives. For instance a folklore is like;
" Gāi gelāk bijubanē
Bāchchur gelāk Rānebanē
Bāgāl gelak Arunbanē
Khūnji Khūnji–Jhāmralai Mai
Tāo Bāgāl ghūrē nāi āishe. "
Translation: The cows had gone to Bijuban, Calf had gone to Raneban, the Bagal (herder boy) had gone to Arunban. I became really tried by searching and searching, but not yet returned the herder boy.
They also sing jhumar song like;
" Hāt gele hāte nāi
Bāt gele bāte nāi
Balē debē hē hāmār saiyãkē
Dhūdhi latē bāndhiab uyàke. "
Translation: In the market, he isn't there, in the village road he isn't seen. Ohh my friends please tell my boyfriend, I shall tie him with Dudhi-lot (symbolising the tie of love).

Politics

In ethnic prospective Bagal community is numerically smaller community living three political zone (i.e. Jharkhand, Odisha and West Bengal) of India. In which various social factor are distinct from each other, specially medium of language both educational and primary spoken language, center of job opportunities and culture of state. So they are assimilating themselves with the local Hindu social order of those states and nowadays as a whole do not hold distinct and standalone prehistorical identity, which is a process of social mobility in India. In the form of sanskritisation, seeking higher social status. They have greater tribal attributes in them but there is no historical records to support as they are tribal or untouchable community except the Bagals of Mayurbhanj state, where Bagals were noted as tribal in 1931 census with the fact that their drinking habits of homemade rice beer (hanria) and socio-cultural alignment to the  Bhumij tribe. However the Bagal community do not fulfills the government defined criteria (that are distinctive culture, indications of primitive traits, geographical isolation, backwardness, shyness of contact with the community at large and victims of untouchability) of enlisting a community in SC and ST list for affirmative action except the backwardness criteria. Therefore, they are not scheduled either as an ST or as an SC to claim any constitutional benefits. Although the Bagals of Bihar (include Jharkhand) and West Bengal were classified as OBC and the Bagals of West Bengal marked as 'Most Backward' by Kalelkar commission, the first Socially and Educationally Backward Classes Commission of India. Then only the Bagals of West Bengal classified as OBC and sub classified as 'Depressed Backward Caste' by Mandal Commission, the second Socially and Educationally Backward Classes Commission of India. But not yet considered as SEBC/OBC. For not being in any scheduled category (that means Bagal caste is considered as General category, the forward caste of India), some of the Bagal people are  asserting themselves as other alike scheduled community in order to avail government sponsored welfare benefits and constitutional privileges of reservation.

In terms of education, the Bagals of West Bengal were classified as educationally backward in 1923. Subsequently, they were considered as eligible for scholarship and stipend for education in 1939. But those plans were not helpful to them as there is less than 13 per cent Bagals attended primary and secondary school in undivided Medinipur district of West Bengal in 1990 and 1.1 percent (18 people) in Mayurbhanj district of Odisha with zero English literacy rate in 1931. The main reason of low literacy rate is their poor economic condition. Which as a whole shows that the Bagals are socioeconomically and educationally backward throughout history. Although their social status improved some extend after Independence of India but not equivalent to their neighbouring caste society.

From above the fact, they are oscillating in between caste pole and tribe pole in the government defined parameters. However, for their socio-cultural, economical and political security they are voicing up from independence of India to state and central government to gain constitutional identity and get enlisted in the list of Scheduled Castes or Tribes but their demands aren't yet considered. Some of the major socio-political events are noted below;

In between 1970 and 1975, there were number of retribalisation movement by Bagal people along with Deswali Majhi, Bhumij, Kudumi Mahato for inclusion of their respective caste in Scheduled list. In 1976 Narendranath Raut along with other Bagals of  Nayagram tempted to lunch a movement to get into the Scheduled tribe list. Subsequently, In 1978 they demonstrated in large near West Bengal Assembly house. On April 21, 1981, Seventh Lok Sabha – 5th session; Shri Matilal Hansda, Jhargram CPI (M) MP raised concern about Bagal community, who are educationally, economically and culturally backward in ground and can be comparable with other schedule caste and tribe. Thus he urged government to take necessary affirmative action on them. On May 15, 1985, Eighth Lok Sabha – 2nd session; Shri Chintamani Jena, Balesore INC MP requested Shrimati Ram Dilari Sinha, The Ministry of Home Affairs for the inclusion of Bagal caste in the scheduled tribe list. Shrimati R.D. Sinha assured that the proposal is considered and will be included after a comprehensive revision. During 2009 Lalgarh insurgency, the Jharkhand Andolan Samannay Mancha (JASM) demanded the inclusion of the Kurmi Mahato and Bagal communities in the list of Scheduled Tribes as a solution. On April 26, 2010, Lok Sabha debate;  Dr Pulin Bihari Baske, Jhargram CPI (M) MP demanded inclusion of Bagal community in tribal (ST) list. On June 28, 2018, Tribal Advisory Council distinguished Bagal caste from Rajuar tribe/caste (who used to claim themselves as Rajuar, similar to the case of the Bagals of undivided Midnapore) and the council recommended to ST & SC Development Department, Government of Odisha not to include Bagal Caste in the Scheduled Tribe list as the people of Bagal caste doesn't possess any tribal characteristic defined by the Government of India after conducting ethnic study in Odisha. On September 27, 2018, Bagals of Morada, Mayurbhanj demonstrated in the district headquarter, Baripada with the support of Jharkhand Mukti Morcha (JMM) and sent a memorandum to the President of India for inclusion of Bagal caste in the Schedule Tribe list. On July 12, 2019,  Bisheshwar Tudu, Mayurbhanj BJP MP informally requested Shri Arjun Munda, The Ministry of Tribal Affairs for inclusion of Bagal caste in the scheduled tribe list.

Notes

References

Citations

Sources

Bibliography 

 Same short ethnography article 'Bagal' caste by P. P. Mahato is published in below three volumes of the ethnographic project 'People of India, 1992', S. K. Singh (ed.) by paraphrasing.

Further reading

 
 
 
 
 
 

 

cattle-herding community
Castes
Social groups of Jharkhand
Social groups of Odisha
Social groups of West Bengal
Bagal people